The 2014–15 season  is Zob Ahan's 13th season in the Persian Gulf Pro League. They will also be competing in the Hazfi Cup . Naft Tehran is captained by Ghasem Hadadifar.

First-team squad
As of 29 December 2014

Loan list

For recent transfers, see List of Iranian football transfers winter 2014–15.

Transfers

In

Competitions

Overview

Results summary

Results by round

Matches

Hazfi Cup

References

Zob Ahan